Matsuba may refer to:

Matsuba Station, a train station in Akita Prefecture, Japan
Matsuba-kai, a yakuza organization based in Tokyo, Japan

People with the surname
, Japanese World War II flying ace
, Japanese baseball player

Japanese-language surnames